The 1992 winners of the Torneo di Viareggio (in English, the Viareggio Tournament, officially the Viareggio Cup World Football Tournament Coppa Carnevale), the annual youth football tournament held in Viareggio, Tuscany, are listed below.

Format
The 24 teams are seeded in 6 groups. Each team from a group meets the others in a single tie. The winning club and runners-up from each group progress to the second round. In the second round teams are split up in two groups and meet in a single tie (with penalties after regular time). Winners progress to the final knockout stage, along with the best losing team from each group. The final round matches include 30 minutes extra time and penalties to be played if the draw between teams still holds. The semifinals losing sides play consolation final. The winning teams play the final with extra time and repeat the match if the draw holds.

Participating teams
Italian teams

  Atalanta
  Avellino
  Bari
  Bologna
  Cesena
  Fiorentina
  Foggia
  Inter Milan
  Juventus
  Lazio
  Lucchese
  Milan
  Modena
  Napoli
  Parma
  Roma
  Torino
  Udinese

European teams

  Bayer 04 Leverkusen
  Nottingham Forest
  Metz
  Dukla Prague
  FC Dynamo Moscow
  Vasas

Group stage

Group A

Group B

Group C

Group D

Group E

Group F

Second round

Knockout stage

Champions

Footnotes

External links
 Official Site (Italian)
 Results on RSSSF.com

1992
1992–93 in Italian football
1992–93 in English football
1992–93 in French football
1992–93 in German football
1992–93 in Czechoslovak football
1992–93 in Hungarian football
1992 in Russian football